Nykhas Uastyrdzhi is the name of Saint George in  Ossetian folklore. Uastyrdzhi is the patron of the male sex and travellers as well as being a guarantor of oaths, like his Iranian counterpart Mithra with whom he shares a common origin. It is forbidden for women to pronounce his name; instead, they must refer to him as  laegty dzuar (literally, "the saint of men").

Rural people have various other names for him such as Uastylag among others.

Uastyrdzhi is invoked in the national anthems of both North Ossetia–Alania and South Ossetia.

He is depicted as a horseman with a long beard, riding on a white horse.
A large public ceremony devoted to him is held in early July at Khetag's Grove, a wood situated three kilometres outside of Alagir, near Suadag village. 
According to legend, Khetag was the son of an Alanian king who consecrated the grove to Uastyrdzhi. Another important ceremony in honour of Uastyrdzhi is held beside a shrine called Rekom in the Tsey Valley in mid-June.

Since the fall of the Soviet Union, the cult of Uastyrdzhi has enjoyed renewed popularity in Ossetian nationalism, and there have been several claims of visitations. The attitude of the local Russian Orthodox Church towards Uastyrdzhi is ambivalent.

The festival of Jiorgwêba is celebrated in Uastyrdzhi's honour in November (and is eponymous of the month's name in Ossetian). It involves the sacrifice of a one-year-old bull. To indicate that the victim belongs to the god, its right horn is cut off long before, forbidding any herdsman to swear on it.

See also
Tetri Giorgi
Uatsdin
Shatana
Saint George and the Dragon

Notes

References

External links

ОСЕТИНСКИЕ ПРАЗДНИКИ   "Ossetian holidays" (in Russian)
images of Hetag's Grove
The Religion of Ossetia: Uastyrdzhi and Nart Batraz in Ossetian mythology , accessed November, 2008

Ossetian mythology
Saint George (martyr)
Eastern Orthodox Christian culture
Supernatural beings identified with Christian saints